Acroma  (also Akramah and Ikrimah) is a town in northeastern Libya in Butnan District, about 28 km west of Tobruk.

On April 17, 1917, the Treaty of Acroma, was signed by the Italian government (as occupying, colonial power) and Mohammed Idris (head of Senussi). The pact was an ambiguous ceasefire recognizing a de facto authority for Idris in Cyrenaica, while not excluding the overall Italian territorial sovereignty.

World War II
During the North African Campaign of World War II, the area was the scene of heavy fighting on several separate occasions. Acroma was captured from Axis forces on December 10, 1941, by the Polish Independent Carpathian Rifle Brigade.

The area was the focus of the Battle of Knightsbridge, during June 1942.

Notes

External links
 "Acroma, Libya. 1941-25. British Tanks of the 4th Brigade, 7th Armoured Division, Advancing Towards Enemy Positions in the Desert", photograph Australian War Memorial Collection #022438
 Satellite map at Maplandia.com

Populated places in Butnan District